A match is a small tool for producing fire and a sports event or game where people or teams compete against each other.

Match may also refer to:

Arts and entertainment

Films
 Match (film), a 2014 American drama film
 The Match (1999 film), a British film
 The Match (2019 film), an Italian film
 The Match (2021 film), a Croatian-American film
 The Match (2023 film), a Korean Netflix film

Television
 The Match (TV programme), a British video game program
 The Match (TV series), a British football television series

Fictional characters
 Match (DC Comics), a clone of Superboy
 Match (Marvel Comics), a mutant in the X-Men universe

Music
 The Matches, a pop-punk band from Oakland, California
 "Matches" (Sammy Kershaw song), 1998
 "Matches" (Britney Spears and Backstreet Boys song), 2020

Other uses in arts and entertainment
 Match (play), a 2004 play by Stephen Belber

Brands and enterprises
 Match (drink), a carbonated soft drink sold in Japan
 Match (supermarket), a supermarket chain in Belgium, France and Luxembourg
 Match Group, the owner of online dating services including Match.com
 Match.com, an online dating service

Periodicals
 Match (magazine), a British football magazine
 Paris Match, a French magazine
 The Match!, an atheist and anarchist journal

Organizations
 Mothers Apart from Their Children, or MATCH, a volunteer support group in the United Kingdom
 National Resident Matching Program, commonly referred to "The Match"; procedure for matching medical students with residency programs in the US

Sports and games
 Match II, the best-known of several thoroughbred racehorses named Match
 The Match (golf), a series of made-for-TV golf challenge matches involving Tiger Woods, Phil Mickelson and other sports stars
 The Match Europe v USA, an athletics annual competition organised by the IAAF
 Match (dominoes), a) to play a domino such that adjacent ends are the same value or b) a domino competition comprising several games

Other uses
 Sam Match (1923–2010), American tennis player
 Project MATCH, an American study of alcoholics and their treatment

See also

 Match grade, a category of firearms and ammunition
 Slow match, a slow-burning cord or twine fuse
 Matching (disambiguation)